Sakara music is a form of popular Nigerian music based in the traditions of Yoruba music.
It mostly in the form of praise songs, that uses only traditional Yoruba instruments such as the solemn-sounding goje violin, and the small round sakara drum, which is similar to a tambourine and is beaten with a stick.
Sakara music overlays the nasalized, melismatic vocals of Eastern Africa and Arabic on the traditional percussion instruments.
The music is often brooding and philosophical in mood.

One of the first performers of this type of music in Lagos was Abibu Oluwa, who started playing in the 1930s. On his death in 1964 his place in the band was taken by Salami Alabi (Lefty) Balogun (October 1913 - 29 December 1981), a talking drummer, who released over 35 records.
Other members of the band included Baba Mukaila, and Joseph (Yussuf) Olatunju.
Yusuf Olatunji (alias Baba l’Egba), who died in 1978, did much to popularize the musical genre and released many records on the Phillips Nigeria label. A street in Abeokuta is named after him.

Sakara music had considerable influence on other genres, including Jùjú and Nigerian Hip Hop.
Fuji music is a mixture of Muslim traditional Were music with elements drawn from Sakara and Apala music.

References

Nigerian music
Yoruba music
African popular music
Popular music